{{DISPLAYTITLE:Victorian Railways NA class}}

The Victorian Railways NA class is a 2-6-2 tank locomotive built for their four 2 ft 6 in (762 mm) gauge branch lines.

The Baldwin Locomotive Works in the United States supplied the first two 2-6-2 tank locomotives, as well as a range of spare parts. These two engines were numbered 1A and 2A and were both placed in service for construction of the Wangaratta to Whitfield line in the North East of Victoria in September 1898. The spare parts from the Baldwin Locomotive Works were used to construct locomotives 3A and 4A at Newport Workshops in 1900 for the Upper Ferntree Gully to Gembrook Line, with further examples of the class entering service up to the last, number 17A, in 1915. Engines 2 and 4 used Vauclain compound high- and low-pressure cylinders, while the rest of the class used simple expansion cylinders.

In 1920 parts were made for 2 more NAs—18A and 19A—but due to a downturn in traffic the order was cancelled, and the parts were used as spares on the other NAs. By the mid-1920s these small locomotives were not able to handle the increasing traffic, and two G class Garratt locomotives were purchased to supplement the fleet on the heavily patronized Walhalla and Beech Forest Lines.

Even with G41 and G42 in service the NAs were still the backbone of the VR Narrow Gauge Lines right up until the 1950s when they were progressively withdrawn from traffic between 1945 and 1960. 1A and 2A were withdrawn and scrapped in September 1929 due to being worn out. 4A was withdrawn in 1933 for the same reason and 16A was withdrawn in 1934 due to low use. They were both scrapped in September 1936. 

Numbers 6A, 7A, 8A, 12A, and 14A have been restored and operate on the Puffing Billy Railway, and No. 3 is also on the Puffing Billy Railway, currently plinthed in a dismantled state in the Lakeside Discovery Centre. The remaining locomotives have all been scrapped.

A  gauge replica of a NA class locomotive was built in 1993 for use on the Isle of Mull Railway.  The engine, named "Victoria", was built by the Mouse Boiler Works, using drawings provided by the Puffing Billy Railway. It operated on the Isle of Mull until the railway's closure in 2011, and is currently operating on the Rudyard Lake Steam Railway.

Preservation
As of January 2021, the Puffing Billy Railway operates NA class locomotives 6A, 7A, 8A, 12A, and 14A. Puffing Billy Railway also have 3A which is awaiting restoration.

3A
Withdrawn from service in 1955. Sold in 1960 to the Lord Mayor’s Camp at Portsea where it remained on static display until 1977 when it was brought to Belgrave for eventual restoration.

Currently located in Lakeside Discovery Centre on display.

6A
6A arrived at the Puffing Billy Railway in June 1962, and was in use on regular service trains until January 1980, when it was withdrawn due to boiler problems. It returned to traffic on 13th of December 1980 but was withdrawn again in September 1983 due to a condemned boiler and moved to the Menzies Creek Steam Museum for Storage on November 30th that year. In April 1988 it returned to Belgrave for axle box repairs, but the following month its boiler was removed and was put into storage at the rear of the running shed along with 12A.

In October 1997 restoration of 6A commenced, led by the workshop's leading hand fitter Ron Gunn. Restoration progressed until March 2001 when 14A's former all steel welded boiler was fitted into 6A's Frames. One of the modifications made under the direction of Nigel Day was the fitting of a new lempor exhaust system similar to L.D. Porta's design for South African Railways' Class 26 3450 the Red Devil. The system allows the exhaust steam to go through the funnel through four flues then up the funnel. A sleeve inside the funnel was also fitted for a quieter exhaust beat. These modifications made the engine extremely efficient, reliable and powerful. The locomotive was also painted in a more historically accurate VR Two Tone Green livery with removable hungry boards on the bunker, tapered steam dome, dummy ash ejectors on the smoke box, small builders plates, and double row of rivets on the water tanks.

From here on it became a high priority to have 6A available for the 2001/2002 Christmas holiday running period which was going to be the first time the Puffing Billy Railway required 4 locomotives to operate trains. On December 17th 2001, 6A moved under its own power for the first time in 18 years. After a couple of test trips over the following the 3 days 6A officially re-entered service on December 22nd. Exactly a month later the Minister for Transport Peter Batchelor officially recommissioned 6A. It has been in regular operation ever since, mainly operating the Gembrook service. Between November 2016 and March 2019 6A was also used on Day out with Thomas Weekends at the New Location of Gembrook, alongside DH59 and 0-4-0 Peckett Sir John Grice in Thomas disguise.

In December 2017 the Lempor was removed and fitted to 14A. 6A was taken out of traffic in March 2019 for a D exam and Overhaul and as of January 2021 is awaiting new boiler tubes prior to reassembly.

7A
7A was the first engine to arrive at the railway in March 1962; it hauled the reopening train to Menzies Creek on the 28th of July that year, and Reopening to lakeside in October 1975. In 1979 7A was repainted two tone green. In the Mid 1990s it was turned to run bunker first towards Belgrave to equalize wear on the tires following a minor overhaul and repaint. On the 18th of December 2000 it hauled the special centenary recreation train to Gembrook and its return trip, celebrating 100 years since the opening of the Upper Ferntree Gully to Gembrook Railway. In June 2005 7A was turned again to equalize wear before returning to facing Gembrook just after its 100th Birthday in August 2005.

In April 2006 it was taken out of service for a full overhaul and repaint into a more historically accurate Canadian Pacific Red and Chocolate. It returned to traffic in December 2007. In May 2010 7A was sent by road to the Walhalla Goldfields Railway to celebrate the line's centenary. 7A is currently in regular traffic having been briefly stored for 9 months due to the COVID-19 pandemic, after which it hauled the reopening train on November 28th 2020.

8A
8A was placed on a plinth in a children's playground in the suburb of Beaumaris near Sandringham in 1955. In 1970 the Puffing Billy Preservation Society purchased and removed the engine first to Newport Workshops, then to Emerald in 1976. The following year restoration of the engine began at Belgrave and was completed in 1982, becoming the backbone of the fleet for the following 20 years.

In 1987 the engine was the first NA to be turned on the newly installed turntable in Emerald to test out wheel wear with the locomotive facing towards Belgrave. In 1988 regular driver Ron Picking fitted a former VR N class five chime whistle to the top of the drivers side water tank. In October 1998 8A became the first NA along with 12A to venture to Gembrook since the 2nd of August 1953 hauling a public shakedown special.

In May 2002 8A was withdrawn from service and given a thorough overhaul, returning to service in October 2006. In June 2019 8A was quickly taken out of service due to issues with the main steam delivery pipes; these were found to have expired and since the railway was experiencing a loco shortage new external steam delivery pipes were fitted instead as a temporary measure. The locomotive is currently in regular traffic.

12A
12A returned to service after an overhaul at Newport in 1973, and was in regular service supplementing the other trafficable NAs at the time. In 1981 12A was used in the ABC television series Come Midnight Monday, where it was named Wombat. In 1982, it was totally worn out and withdrawn from traffic.

In 1985 it was placed in storage at the rear of the workshop headshunt in a dismantled state along with 6A until 1990 when it was moved into the workshop for restoration and overhaul. It returned to service in March 1993 in all-over black livery. In 1998 12A joined 8A with the first passenger train to Gembrook in early october, and then the first regular Gembrook Service on Monday 19 October. In June 2004, 12A was grimed up for a special 1950s style Mixed train to Gembrook.

After a D exam it returned to traffic in March 2005 in Black with red bufferbeams and running boards to commemorate 50 years of the Puffing Billy Preservation Society. In early October 2005, once the celebrations were completed, 12A was taken out of service pending a major overhaul. In December that year it was placed in storage at the Menzies Creek Museum. 10 months later, in October 2006 it was moved under its own steam back to Belgrave, and then its overhaul finally commenced. In 2008, a group of apprentices painted the side tanks and cab of the locomotive Canadian Pacific Red and Chocolate. The overhaul was finally completed in 2013, with the loco returning to service in September of that year. As of January 2021 it is currently undergoing a D exam.

14A
14A arrived at the railway in 1965 after a repaint and repairs at Newport. In April 1974, it was taken for an unauthorised joyride to Selby at around midnight. It was intercepted by police and volunteers at Long Pockitt Lane. Later that same year 14A got fitted with electric headlights taken off ex-APC Fyansford Garrett No 2. Three years later on October 1 1977, 14A along with 12A hauled the first train under the ownership of the Emerald Tourist Railway Board.

In 1979 14A was repainted in Canadian Pacific Red and Chocolate, a colour it bore into the early 1990s. In 1988 the Electric Headlights from No 2 were removed and the engine was fitted with standard VR Headlights. In 1995 it was repainted in a more accurate version of the CP Red Colour Scheme, and in 1998 it hauled the first official train to Gembrook in 45 years on October 18th. During a D exam from April to December 2004, 14A was fitted with a cowcatcher on the front bufferbeam, something which it hadn't had since the early 1940s.

In May 2006 it was placed on standby duties to prolong its serviceable life as it was due for a heavy overhaul. In July 2008 it was taken out of traffic and given top priority for its overhaul, and it was returned to traffic in March 2009 in all over black livery with its front cowcatcher being removed. For the next few years it became the backbone of operations on the Puffing Billy Railway until April 2017 when it was placed out of service for a D exam; during this D exam 14A was selected to be the engine fitted with oil firing to allow it to operate on the Lakeside Gembrook section in summer. The locomotive also received the Lempor exhaust system out of 6A in November 2017 for better performance. In March 2018 it began running test trains and it was officially placed back in traffic on October 18th 2018. It is currently in traffic.

Gallery

References 

NA class 
2-6-2T locomotives
2 ft 6 in gauge locomotives
Baldwin locomotives